The UK Singles Chart is a weekly record chart compiled by the Official Charts Company (OCC) on behalf of the British record industry. As of 10 July 2015, the chart week runs from Friday to Thursday with the chart-date given as the following Thursday. Before this, the chart week ran from Sunday to Saturday, with the chart date given as the following Saturday. During the 2010s, a total of 242 songs reached number one on the UK Singles Chart. Joe McElderry was the first artist to top the chart in the decade, when "The Climb" replaced "Killing in the Name" by Rage Against the Machine. The final number-one of the decade was the novelty song "I Love Sausage Rolls" by LadBaby.

Digital downloads made up the majority of music sales at the start of the decade. In 2011, singles sales hit an all-time high, a record that was then surpassed in 2012. From July 2014, as download sales began to decline, audio streaming began to be counted at a rate of 100 streams equivalent to a sale, later increased to 150 streams, and later still to 300 streams once a song had spent a certain time on the charts and its consumption had declined.

The following singles were all number one in the United Kingdom during the 2010s.

Number-one singles

Artists with the most number ones
Nineteen artists all had at least four number-one singles during the 2010s. Calvin Harris and Ed Sheeran both had eight, more than anyone else.

Songs with the most weeks at number one
The following songs spent at least six weeks at number one during the 2010s.

Artists with the most weeks at number one
The following artists have all spent a total of nine or more weeks at the number-one spot during the 2010s.

Record labels with the most weeks at number one

Fourteen record labels have spent ten or more weeks at the top of the UK Singles Chart during the 2010s.

Million-selling and Platinum records
Since April 1973, the British Phonographic Industry has been classifying singles by the number of units shipped or by sales. The highest threshold is "Platinum record" and is currently awarded to singles that have shipped or sold over 600,000 units. From July 2014, BPI certifications (along with the Official Singles Chart) include audio streaming at 100 streams equal to one unit; these are referred to as 'combined sales' or 'chart sales'. So for example, "All of Me" by John Legend was certified double Platinum (1,200,000 combined sales) in October 2014 and became a million-seller in January 2015.

For million selling records see List of million-selling singles in the United Kingdom

For Platinum singles see List of Platinum singles in the United Kingdom awarded since 2000

See also
 List of UK Albums Chart number ones of the 2010s
 List of Official Subscription Plays Chart number-one songs of the 2010s

Notes
A.  The Calvin Harris and Dua Lipa song "One Kiss" was jointly released by Sony Music and WMG as the record featured Columbia Records artist Harris and Dua Lipa, signed to WMG's Warner Brothers label.
B.  These totals do not include the instances when parent company Warner Music (WMG) is listed with group labels Atlantic or East West Records.

other notes

References

External links
Official UK Singles Top 100 at the Official Charts Company
The Official UK Top 40 Singles Chart at BBC Radio 1

2010s
Number-one singles
United Kingdom Singles